Selce is a village in the municipality of Štip, North Macedonia.

Demographics
As of the 2021 census, Selce had 140 residents with the following ethnic composition:
Turks 107
Persons for whom data are taken from administrative sources 16
Macedonians 15
Serbs 2

According to the 2002 census, the village had a total of 169 inhabitants. Ethnic groups in the village include:
Turks 146
Macedonians 18
Serbs 5

References

Villages in Štip Municipality
Turkish communities in North Macedonia